The Daegu Metropolitan Council is the local council of Daegu.

There are a total of 30 members, with 27 members elected in the First-past-the-post voting system and 3 members elected in Party-list proportional representation.

Current composition 

The Daegu Metropolitan Council has no regulations on the negotiation group.

Organization 
The structure of Council consists of:
Chairman
Two Vice-chairmen
Standing Committees
Steering Committee
Strategy and Administration Committee
Culture and Welfare Committee
Economy and Environment Committee
Construction and Transport Committee
Education Committee
Special Committees
Special Committees on Budget and Accounts
Special Committees on Ethics

Recent election results

2018 

|- style="text-align:center;"
! rowspan="2" colspan="3" width="200" | Party
! colspan="4" | Constituency
! colspan="4" | Party list
! colspan="2" | Total seats
|- style="text-align:center;"
! width="70" | Votes
! width="40" | %
! width="40" | Seats
! width="32" | ±
! width="70" | Votes
! width="40" | %
! width="40" | Seats
! width="32" | ±
! width="40" | Seats
! width="32" | ±
|-
| width="1" style="background-color:" |
| style="text-align:left;" colspan=2| Liberty Korea Party
| 520,730 || 47.62 || 23 || 4
| 528,806 || 46.14 || 2 || 0
| 25 || 4
|-
| width="1" style="background-color:" |
| style="text-align:left;" colspan=2| Democratic Party of Korea
| 394,277 || 36.05 || 4 || 4
| 410,081 || 35.78 || 1 || 0
| 5 || 4
|-
| width="1" style="background-color:" |
| style="text-align:left;" colspan=2| Bareunmirae Party
| 61,602 || 5.64 || 0 || new
| 123,592 || 10.78 || 0 || new
| 0 || new
|-
| width="1" style="background-color:" |
| style="text-align:left;" colspan=2| Justice Party
| 14,202 || 1.31 || 0 || 0
| 49,736 || 4.34 || 0 || 0
| 0 || 0
|-
| width="1" style="background-color:" |
| style="text-align:left;" colspan=2| Korean Patriots' Party
| 7,057 || 0.66 || 0 || new
| 15,211 || 1.32 || 0 || new
| 0 || new
|-
| width="1" style="background-color:" |
| style="text-align:left;" colspan=2| Green Party Korea
| colspan=4 
| 7,535 || 0.65 || 0 || 0
| 0 || 0
|-
| width="1" style="background-color:" |
| style="text-align:left;" colspan=2| Minjung Party
| 9,791 || 0.91 || 0 || new
| 5,559 || 0.48 || 0 || new
| 0 || new
|-
| width="1" style="background-color:#DC143C" |
| style="text-align:left;" colspan=2| Labor Party
| colspan=4 
| 5,380 || 0.46 || 0 || new
| 0 || new
|-
| width="1" style="background-color:" |
| style="text-align:left;" colspan=2| Independents
| 85,354 || 7.81 || 0 || 0
| colspan=4 
| 0 || 0
|-
|- style="background-color:#E9E9E9"
| colspan=3 style="text-align:center;" | Total
| 1,094,013 || 100.00 || 27 || –
| 1,145,900 || 100.00 || 3 || –
| 30 || –
|}

References 

Daegu
Provincial councils of South Korea